Hall Gibson Haynes (October 3, 1928 – June 15, 1988) was an American football cornerback in the National Football League for the Washington Redskins and the Los Angeles Rams.  He played college football at Santa Clara University and was drafted in the second round of the 1950 NFL Draft.

1928 births
1988 deaths
People from Duncan, Oklahoma
American football cornerbacks
Los Angeles Rams players
Santa Clara Broncos football players
Washington Redskins players